Streblacanthus is a genus of flowering plants belonging to the family Acanthaceae.

Its native range is Southern Mexico to Central America, Peru to Northern Brazil.

Species
Species:

Streblacanthus amoenus 
Streblacanthus monospermus 
Streblacanthus parviflorus

References

Acanthaceae
Acanthaceae genera